Vanderlan Vieira Cardoso (born November 15, 1962) is a Brazilian businessman and politician. He was mayor of Senador Canedo (2005–2010). Cardoso ran the government of Goiás in 2010 and 2014 and mayor of Goiânia in 2016. Was defeated by Iris Rezende (MDB) in the second round.

In 2018 he was elected senator of Brazil by Goiás in the legend Progressive Party (PP) and now is member of Social Democratic Party (PSD).

References 

1962 births
Living people
Social Democratic Party (Brazil, 2011) politicians
Members of the Federal Senate (Brazil)